Francesco Petrarca (20 July 1304 – 18/19 July 1374), commonly anglicized as Petrarch, was a scholar and poet of early Renaissance Italy, and one of the earliest humanists.

Petrarch's rediscovery of Cicero's letters is often credited with initiating the 14th-century Italian Renaissance and the founding of Renaissance humanism. In the 16th century, Pietro Bembo created the model for the modern Italian language based on Petrarch's works, as well as those of Giovanni Boccaccio, and, to a lesser extent, Dante Alighieri. Petrarch was later endorsed as a model for Italian style by the Accademia della Crusca.

Petrarch's sonnets were admired and imitated throughout Europe during the Renaissance and became a model for lyrical poetry. He is also known for being the first to develop the concept of the "Dark Ages".

Biography

Youth and early career
Petrarch was born in the Tuscan city of Arezzo on 20 July 1304. He was the son of Ser Petracco and his wife Eletta Canigiani. His given name was Francesco Petracco, which was Latinized to Petrarca. Petrarch's younger brother was born in Incisa in Val d'Arno in 1307. Dante Alighieri was a friend of his father.

Petrarch spent his early childhood in the village of Incisa, near Florence. He spent much of his early life at Avignon and nearby Carpentras, where his family moved to follow Pope Clement V, who moved there in 1309 to begin the Avignon Papacy. Petrarch studied law at the University of Montpellier (1316–20) and Bologna (1320–23) with a lifelong friend and schoolmate, Guido Sette, future archbishop of Genoa. Because his father was in the legal profession (a notary), he insisted that Petrarch and his brother also study law. Petrarch, however, was primarily interested in writing and Latin literature and considered these seven years wasted. Petrarch often got too distracted by his non-legal interests, that his father once threw his books into a fire, which he later lamented for.  Additionally, he proclaimed that through legal manipulation his guardians robbed him of his small property inheritance in Florence, which only reinforced his dislike for the legal system. He protested, "I couldn't face making a merchandise of my mind", since he viewed the legal system as the art of selling justice.

Petrarch was a prolific letter writer and counted Boccaccio among his notable friends to whom he wrote often. After the death of their parents, Petrarch and his brother Gherardo went back to Avignon in 1326, where he worked in numerous clerical offices. This work gave him much time to devote to his writing. With his first large-scale work, Africa, an epic in Latin about the great Roman general Scipio Africanus, Petrarch emerged as a European celebrity. On 8 April 1341, he became the second poet laureate since classical antiquity and was crowned by Roman Senatori Giordano Orsini and Orso dell'Anguillara on the holy grounds of Rome's Capitol.

He traveled widely in Europe, served as an ambassador, and, because he traveled for pleasure, as with his ascent of Mont Ventoux, has been called "the first tourist".
During his travels, he collected crumbling Latin manuscripts and was a prime mover in the recovery of knowledge from writers of Rome and Greece. He encouraged and advised Leontius Pilatus's translation of Homer from a manuscript purchased by Boccaccio, although he was severely critical of the result. Petrarch had acquired a copy, which he did not entrust to Leontius, but he knew no Greek; Petrarch said of himself, "Homer was dumb to him, while he was deaf to Homer". In 1345 he personally discovered a collection of Cicero's letters not previously known to have existed, the collection Epistulae ad Atticum, in the Chapter Library (Biblioteca Capitolare) of Verona Cathedral.

Disdaining what he believed to be the ignorance of the era in which he lived, Petrarch is credited with creating the concept of a historical "Dark Ages",  which most modern scholars now find inaccurate and misleading.

Mount Ventoux

Petrarch recounts that on 26 April 1336, with his brother and two servants, he climbed to the top of Mont Ventoux, a feat which he undertook for recreation rather than necessity. The exploit is described in a celebrated letter addressed to his friend and confessor, the monk Dionigi di Borgo San Sepolcro, composed some time after the fact. In it, Petrarch claimed to have been inspired by Philip V of Macedon's ascent of Mount Haemo and that an aged peasant had told him that nobody had ascended Ventoux before or after himself, 50 years earlier, and warned him against attempting to do so. The nineteenth-century Swiss historian Jacob Burckhardt noted that Jean Buridan had climbed the same mountain a few years before, and ascents accomplished during the Middle Ages have been recorded, including that of Anno II, Archbishop of Cologne.

Scholars note that Petrarch's letter to Dionigi displays a strikingly "modern" attitude of aesthetic gratification in the grandeur of the scenery and is still often cited in books and journals devoted to the sport of mountaineering. In Petrarch, this attitude is coupled with an aspiration for a virtuous Christian life, and on reaching the summit, he took from his pocket a volume by his beloved mentor, Saint Augustine, that he always carried with him.

For pleasure alone he climbed Mont Ventoux, which rises to more than six thousand feet, beyond Vaucluse. It was no great feat, of course; but he was the first recorded Alpinist of modern times, the first to climb a mountain merely for the delight of looking from its top. (Or almost the first; for in a high pasture he met an old shepherd, who said that fifty years before he had attained the summit, and had got nothing from it save toil and repentance and torn clothing.) Petrarch was dazed and stirred by the view of the Alps, the mountains around Lyons, the Rhone, the Bay of Marseilles. He took Augustine's Confessions from his pocket and reflected that his climb was merely an allegory of aspiration toward a better life.

As the book fell open, Petrarch's eyes were immediately drawn to the following words:

Petrarch's response was to turn from the outer world of nature to the inner world of "soul":

James Hillman argues that this rediscovery of the inner world is the real significance of the Ventoux event. The Renaissance begins not with the ascent of Mont Ventoux but with the subsequent descent—the "return [...] to the valley of soul", as Hillman puts it. 

Arguing against such a singular and hyperbolic periodization, Paul James suggests a different reading:

Later years
Petrarch spent the later part of his life journeying through northern Italy as an international scholar and poet-diplomat. His career in the Church did not allow him to marry, but he is believed to have fathered two children by a woman or women unknown to posterity. A son, Giovanni, was born in 1337, and a daughter, Francesca, was born in 1343. He later legitimized both.

Giovanni died of the plague in 1361. In the same year Petrarch was named canon in Monselice near Padua. Francesca married Francescuolo da Brossano (who was later named executor of Petrarch's will) that same year. In 1362, shortly after the birth of a daughter, Eletta (the same name as Petrarch's mother), they joined Petrarch in Venice to flee the plague then ravaging parts of Europe. A second grandchild, Francesco, was born in 1366, but died before his second birthday. Francesca and her family lived with Petrarch in Venice for five years from 1362 to 1367 at Palazzo Molina; although Petrarch continued to travel in those years. Between 1361 and 1369 the younger Boccaccio paid the older Petrarch two visits. The first was in Venice, the second was in Padua.

About 1368 Petrarch and Francesca (with her family) moved to the small town of Arquà in the Euganean Hills near Padua, where he passed his remaining years in religious contemplation. He died in his house in Arquà on 18/19 July 1374. The house hosts now a permanent exhibition of Petrarchian works and curiosities, including the famous tomb of an embalmed cat long believed to be Petrarch's (although there is no evidence Petrarch actually had a cat). On the marble slab, there is a Latin inscription written by Antonio Quarenghi:

Petrarch's will (dated 4 April 1370) leaves 50 florins to Boccaccio "to buy a warm winter dressing gown"; various legacies (a horse, a silver cup, a lute, a Madonna) to his brother and his friends; his house in Vaucluse to its caretaker; for his soul, and for the poor; and the bulk of his estate to his son-in-law, Francescuolo da Brossano, who is to give half of it to "the person to whom, as he knows, I wish it to go"; presumably his daughter, Francesca, Brossano's wife.  The will mentions neither the property in Arquà nor his library; Petrarch's library of notable manuscripts was already promised to Venice, in exchange for the Palazzo Molina.  This arrangement was probably cancelled when he moved to Padua, the enemy of Venice, in 1368.  The library was seized by the lords of Padua, and his books and manuscripts are now widely scattered over Europe. Nevertheless, the Biblioteca Marciana traditionally claimed this bequest as its founding, although it was in fact founded by Cardinal Bessarion in 1468.

Works

Petrarch is best known for his Italian poetry, notably the Rerum vulgarium fragmenta ("Fragments of Vernacular Matters"), a collection of 366 lyric poems in various genres also known as 'canzoniere' ('songbook'), and I trionfi ("The Triumphs"), a six-part narrative poem of Dantean inspiration. However, Petrarch was an enthusiastic Latin scholar and did most of his writing in this language. His Latin writings include scholarly works, introspective essays, letters, and more poetry. Among them are Secretum ("My Secret Book"), an intensely personal, imaginary dialogue with a figure inspired by Augustine of Hippo; De Viris Illustribus ("On Famous Men"), a series of moral biographies; Rerum Memorandarum Libri, an incomplete treatise on the cardinal virtues; De Otio Religiosorum ("On Religious Leisure") and De vita solitaria ("On the Solitary Life"), which praise the contemplative life; De Remediis Utriusque Fortunae ("Remedies for Fortune Fair and Foul"), a self-help book which remained popular for hundreds of years; Itinerarium ("Petrarch's Guide to the Holy Land"); invectives against opponents such as doctors, scholastics, and the French; the Carmen Bucolicum, a collection of 12 pastoral poems; and the unfinished epic Africa. He translated seven psalms, a collection known as the Penitential Psalms.

Petrarch also published many volumes of his letters, including a few written to his long-dead friends from history such as Cicero and Virgil. Cicero, Virgil, and Seneca were his literary models. Most of his Latin writings are difficult to find today, but several of his works are available in English translations. Several of his Latin works are scheduled to appear in the Harvard University Press series I Tatti. It is difficult to assign any precise dates to his writings because he tended to revise them throughout his life.

Petrarch collected his letters into two major sets of books called Rerum familiarum liber ("Letters on Familiar Matters") and Seniles ("Letters of Old Age"), both of which are available in English translation. The plan for his letters was suggested to him by knowledge of Cicero's letters. These were published "without names" to protect the recipients, all of whom had close relationships to Petrarch. The recipients of these letters included Philippe de Cabassoles, bishop of Cavaillon; Ildebrandino Conti, bishop of Padua; Cola di Rienzo, tribune of Rome; Francesco Nelli, priest of the Prior of the Church of the Holy Apostles in Florence; and Niccolò di Capoccia, a cardinal and priest of Saint Vitalis. His "Letter to Posterity" (the last letter in Seniles) gives an autobiography and a synopsis of his philosophy in life. It was originally written in Latin and was completed in 1371 or 1372—the first such autobiography in a thousand years (since Saint Augustine).

While Petrarch's poetry was set to music frequently after his death, especially by Italian madrigal composers of the Renaissance in the 16th century, only one musical setting composed during Petrarch's lifetime survives. This is Non al suo amante by Jacopo da Bologna, written around 1350.

Laura and poetry

On 6 April 1327, after Petrarch gave up his vocation as a priest, the sight of a woman called "Laura" in the church of Sainte-Claire d'Avignon awoke in him a lasting passion, celebrated in the Rerum vulgarium fragmenta ("Fragments of Vernacular Matters"). Laura may have been Laura de Noves, the wife of Count Hugues de Sade (an ancestor of the Marquis de Sade). There is little definite information in Petrarch's work concerning Laura, except that she is lovely to look at, fair-haired, with a modest, dignified bearing. Laura and Petrarch had little or no personal contact. According to his "Secretum", she refused him because she was already married. He channeled his feelings into love poems that were exclamatory rather than persuasive, and wrote prose that showed his contempt for men who pursue women.  Upon her death in 1348, the poet found that his grief was as difficult to live with as was his former despair.  Later, in his "Letter to Posterity", Petrarch wrote: "In my younger days I struggled constantly with an overwhelming but pure love affair—my only one, and I would have struggled with it longer had not premature death, bitter but salutary for me, extinguished the cooling flames. I certainly wish I could say that I have always been entirely free from desires of the flesh, but I would be lying if I did".

While it is possible she was an idealized or pseudonymous character—particularly since the name "Laura" has a linguistic connection to the poetic "laurels" Petrarch coveted—Petrarch himself always denied it. His frequent use of l'aura is also remarkable: for example, the line "Erano i capei d'oro a l'aura sparsi" may mean both "her hair was all over Laura's body" and "the wind (l'aura) blew through her hair". There is psychological realism in the description of Laura, although Petrarch draws heavily on conventionalised descriptions of love and lovers from troubadour songs and other literature of courtly love. Her presence causes him unspeakable joy, but his unrequited love creates unendurable desires, inner conflicts between the ardent lover and the mystic Christian, making it impossible to reconcile the two. Petrarch's quest for love leads to hopelessness and irreconcilable anguish, as he expresses in the series of paradoxes in Rima 134 "Pace non trovo, et non ò da far guerra;/e temo, et spero; et ardo, et son un ghiaccio": "I find no peace, and yet I make no war:/and fear, and hope: and burn, and I am ice".

Laura is unreachable and evanescent – descriptions of her are evocative yet fragmentary. Francesco de Sanctis praises the powerful music of his verse in his Storia della letteratura italiana. Gianfranco Contini, in a famous essay ("Preliminari sulla lingua del Petrarca". Petrarca, Canzoniere. Turin, Einaudi, 1964), has described Petrarch's language in terms of "unilinguismo" (contrasted with Dantean "plurilinguismo").

Sonnet 227

Dante

Petrarch is very different from Dante and his Divina Commedia. In spite of the metaphysical subject, the Commedia is deeply rooted in the cultural and social milieu of turn-of-the-century Florence: Dante's rise to power (1300) and exile (1302); his political passions call for a "violent" use of language, where he uses all the registers, from low and trivial to sublime and philosophical. Petrarch confessed to Boccaccio that he had never read the Commedia, remarks Contini, wondering whether this was true or Petrarch wanted to distance himself from Dante. Dante's language evolves as he grows old, from the courtly love of his early stilnovistic Rime and Vita nuova to the Convivio and Divina Commedia, where Beatrice is sanctified as the goddess of philosophy—the philosophy announced by the Donna Gentile at the death of Beatrice.

In contrast, Petrarch's thought and style are relatively uniform throughout his life—he spent much of it revising the songs and sonnets of the Canzoniere rather than moving to new subjects or poetry. Here, poetry alone provides a consolation for personal grief, much less philosophy or politics (as in Dante), for Petrarch fights within himself (sensuality versus mysticism, profane versus Christian literature), not against anything outside of himself. The strong moral and political convictions which had inspired Dante belong to the Middle Ages and the libertarian spirit of the commune; Petrarch's moral dilemmas, his refusal to take a stand in politics, his reclusive life point to a different direction, or time. The free commune, the place that had made Dante an eminent politician and scholar, was being dismantled: the signoria was taking its place. Humanism and its spirit of empirical inquiry, however, were making progress—but the papacy (especially after Avignon) and the empire (Henry VII, the last hope of the white Guelphs, died near Siena in 1313) had lost much of their original prestige.

Petrarch polished and perfected the sonnet form inherited from Giacomo da Lentini and which Dante widely used in his Vita nuova to popularise the new courtly love of the Dolce Stil Novo. The tercet benefits from Dante's terza rima (compare the Divina Commedia), the quatrains prefer the ABBA–ABBA to the ABAB–ABAB scheme of the Sicilians. The imperfect rhymes of u with closed o and i with closed e (inherited from Guittone's mistaken rendering of Sicilian verse) are excluded, but the rhyme of open and closed o is kept. Finally, Petrarch's enjambment creates longer semantic units by connecting one line to the following. The vast majority (317) of Petrarch's 366 poems collected in the Canzoniere (dedicated to Laura) were sonnets, and the Petrarchan sonnet still bears his name.

Philosophy
Petrarch is often referred to as the father of humanism and considered by many to be the "father of the Renaissance". In Secretum meum, he points out that secular achievements do not necessarily preclude an authentic relationship with God, arguing instead that God has given humans their vast intellectual and creative potential to be used to its fullest. He inspired humanist philosophy, which led to the intellectual flowering of the Renaissance. He believed in the immense moral and practical value of the study of ancient history and literaturethat is, the study of human thought and action. Petrarch was a devout Catholic and did not see a conflict between realizing humanity's potential and having religious faith, although many philosophers and scholars have styled him a Proto-Protestant who challenged the Pope's dogma.

A highly introspective man, Petrarch helped shape the nascent humanist movement as many of the internal conflicts and musings expressed in his writings were embraced by Renaissance humanist philosophers and argued continually for the next 200 years. For example, he struggled with the proper relation between the active and contemplative life, and tended to emphasize the importance of solitude and study. In a clear disagreement with Dante, in 1346 Petrarch argued in De vita solitaria that Pope Celestine V's refusal of the papacy in 1294 was a virtuous example of solitary life. Later the politician and thinker Leonardo Bruni (1370–1444) argued for the active life, or "civic humanism". As a result, a number of political, military, and religious leaders during the Renaissance were inculcated with the notion that their pursuit of personal fulfillment should be grounded in classical example and philosophical contemplation.

Legacy

Petrarch's influence is evident in the works of Serafino Ciminelli from Aquila (1466–1500) and in the works of Marin Držić (1508–1567) from Dubrovnik.

The Romantic composer Franz Liszt set three of Petrarch's Sonnets (47, 104, and 123) to music for voice, Tre sonetti del Petrarca, which he later would transcribe for solo piano for inclusion in the suite Années de Pèlerinage. Liszt also set a poem by Victor Hugo, "Oh! quand je dors" in which Petrarch and Laura are invoked as the epitome of erotic love.

While in Avignon in 1991, Modernist composer Elliott Carter completed his solo flute piece Scrivo in Vento which is in part inspired by and structured by Petrarch's Sonnet 212, Beato in sogno. It was premiered on Petrarch's 687th birthday.

In November 2003, it was announced that pathological anatomists would be exhuming Petrarch's body from his casket in Arquà Petrarca, to verify 19th-century reports that he had stood 1.83 meters (about six feet), which would have been tall for his period. The team from the University of Padua also hoped to reconstruct his cranium to generate a computerized image of his features to coincide with his 700th birthday. The tomb had been opened previously in 1873 by Professor Giovanni Canestrini, also of Padua University. When the tomb was opened, the skull was discovered in fragments and a DNA test revealed that the skull was not Petrarch's, prompting calls for the return of Petrarch's skull.

The researchers are fairly certain that the body in the tomb is Petrarch's due to the fact that the skeleton bears evidence of injuries mentioned by Petrarch in his writings, including a kick from a donkey when he was 42.

Numismatics 

He is credited with being the first and most famous aficionado of Numismatics. He described visiting Rome and asking peasants to bring him ancient coins they would find in the soil which he would buy from them, and writes of his delight at being able to identify the names and features of Roman emperors.

Works in English translation

 Francesco Petrarch, Letters on Familiar Matters (Rerum familiarium libri), translated by Aldo S. Bernardo (New York: Italica Press, 2005). Volume 1, Books 1–8; Volume 2, Books 9–16; Volume 3, Books 17–24 
 Francesco Petrarch, Letters of Old Age (Rerum senilium libri), translated by Aldo S. Bernardo, Saul Levin &  Reta A. Bernardo (New York: Italica Press, 2005). Volume 1, Books 1–9; Volume 2, Books 10–18 
 Francesco Petrarch, My Secret Book, (Secretum), translated by Nicholas Mann. Harvard University Press 
 Francesco Petrarch, On Religious Leisure (De otio religioso), edited & translated by Susan S. Schearer, introduction by Ronald G. Witt (New York: Italica Press, 2002) 
 Francesco Petrarch, The Revolution of Cola di Rienzo, translated from Latin and edited by Mario E. Cosenza; 3rd, revised, edition by Ronald G. Musto (New York; Italica Press, 1996) 
 Francesco Petrarch, Selected Letters, vol. 1 and 2, translated by Elaine Fantham. Harvard University Press 
Francesco Petrarch, The Canzoniere, or Rerum vulgarium fragmenta, translated by Mark Musa, Indiana University Press, 1996,

See also 
 Otium

Notes

References
 Bartlett, Kenneth R. (1992). The Civilization of the Italian Renaissance; a Source Book. Lexington: D.C. Heath and Company. 
 Bishop, Morris (1961). "Petrarch." In J. H. Plumb (Ed.), Renaissance Profiles, pp. 1–17. New York: Harper & Row.  .
 Hanawalt, A. Barbara (1998). The Middle Ages: An Illustrated History pp. 131–132 New York: Oxford University Press  
 
 Kallendorf, Craig. "The Historical Petrarch," The American Historical Review, Vol. 101, No. 1 (Feb. 1996): 130–141.

Further reading
 Bernardo, Aldo (1983). "Petrarch." In Dictionary of the Middle Ages, volume 9
 Celenza, Christopher S. (2017). Petrarch: Everywhere a Wanderer. London: Reaktion. 
 Hennigfeld, Ursula (2008). Der ruinierte Körper. Petrarkistische Sonette in transkultureller Perspektive. Würzburg, Königshausen & Neumann, 2008, 
 Hollway-Calthrop, Henry (1907). Petrarch: His Life and Times, Methuen. From Google Books
 Kohl, Benjamin G. (1978). "Francesco Petrarch: Introduction; How a Ruler Ought to Govern His State," in The Earthly Republic: Italian Humanists on Government and Society, ed. Benjamin G. Kohl and Ronald G. Witt, 25–78. Philadelphia: University of Pennsylvania Press. 
 Nauert, Charles G. (2006). Humanism and the Culture of Renaissance Europe: Second Edition. Cambridge: Cambridge University Press. 
 Rawski, Conrad H. (1991). Petrarch's Remedies for Fortune Fair and Foul A Modern English Translation of De remediis utriusque Fortune, with a Commentary. 
 Robinson, James Harvey (1898). Petrarch, the First Modern Scholar and Man of Letters Harvard University
 
 A. Lee, Petrarch and St. Augustine: Classical Scholarship, Christian Theology and the Origins of the Renaissance in Italy, Brill, Leiden, 2012, 
 N. Mann, Petrarca [Ediz. orig. Oxford University Press (1984)] – Ediz. ital. a cura di G. Alessio e L. Carlo Rossi – Premessa di G. Velli, LED Edizioni Universitarie, Milano, 1993, 
 Il Canzoniere» di Francesco Petrarca. La Critica Contemporanea, G. Barbarisi e C. Berra (edd.), LED Edizioni Universitarie, Milano, 1992, 
 G. Baldassari, Unum in locum. Strategie macrotestuali nel Petrarca politico, LED Edizioni Universitarie, Milano, 2006, 
 Francesco Petrarca, Rerum vulgarium Fragmenta. Edizione critica di Giuseppe Savoca, Olschki, Firenze, 2008, 
 Plumb, J. H., The Italian Renaissance, Houghton Mifflin, 2001, 
 Giuseppe Savoca, Il Canzoniere di Petrarca. Tra codicologia ed ecdotica, Olschki, Firenze, 2008, 
 Roberta Antognini, Il progetto autobiografico delle "Familiares" di Petrarca, LED Edizioni Universitarie, Milano, 2008, 
 Paul Geyer und Kerstin Thorwarth (hg), Petrarca und die Herausbildung des modernen Subjekts (Göttingen, Vandenhoeck & Ruprecht, 2009) (Gründungsmythen Europas in Literatur, Musik und Kunst, 2)
 Massimo Colella, «Cantin le ninfe co' soavi accenti». Per una definizione del petrarchismo di Veronica Gambara, in «Testo», 2022.

External links

 Petrarch and his Cat Muse
 Petrarch from the Catholic Encyclopedia
 Excerpts from his works and letters
 Francesco Petrarca (Petrarch) (1304–1374)
 
 
 
 
 Timeline of life of Petrarch
 Poems From The Canzoniere, translated by Tony Kline.
 Francesco Petrarch at The Online Library of Liberty
 De remediis utriusque fortunae, Cremonae, B. de Misintis ac Caesaris Parmensis, 1492. (Vicifons)
 
 Petrarch and Laura Multi-lingual site including translated works in the public domain and biography, pictures, music.
 Petrarch – the poet who lost his head April 2004 article in The Guardian regarding the exhumation of Petrarch's remains
 Oregon Petrarch Open Book – A working database-driven hypertext in and around Francis Petrarch's Rerum Vulgarium Fragmenta (Canzoniere)
 Historia Griseldis From the Rare Book and Special Collections Division at the Library of Congress
 Francesco Petrarch, De viris illustribus, digitized French codex, at Somni
 Petrarch's Vision of the Muslim and Byzantine East – Nancy Bisaha, Speculum, University of Chicago Press

 
Italian Renaissance humanists
Italian Renaissance writers
1304 births
1374 deaths
Bibliophiles
Book and manuscript collectors
Christian humanists
Italian male poets
Italian Roman Catholics
People from Arezzo
Rhetoricians
Roman Catholic writers
Sonneteers
14th-century Italian historians
14th-century Italian poets
14th-century Italian writers
14th-century Latin writers
Proto-Protestants